Ágnes Keleti (née Klein; born 9 January 1921) is a Hungarian-Israeli retired Olympic and world champion artistic gymnast and coach. She is the oldest living Olympic champion and medalist, reaching her 100th birthday on 9 January 2021. While representing Hungary at the Summer Olympics, she won 10 Olympic medals including five gold medals, three silver medals, and two bronze medals, and is considered to be one of the most successful Jewish Olympic athletes of all time. Keleti holds more Olympic medals than any other individual with Israeli citizenship, and more Olympic medals than any other Jew, except Mark Spitz. She was the most successful athlete at the 1956 Summer Olympics. In 1957, Keleti immigrated to Israel, where she lived before returning to Hungary in 2015.

Career
Keleti is Jewish, and was born in Budapest, Hungary. She began gymnastics at the age of 4, and by 16 was the Hungarian National Champion in gymnastics. Over the course of her career, between 1937 and 1956, she won the Championships title ten times.

Keleti was considered a top prospect for the Hungarian team at the 1940 Olympics, but the escalation of World War II canceled both the 1940 and the 1944 Games. She was expelled from her gymnastics club in 1941 for being a non-Aryan. Keleti was forced to go into hiding to survive the war. Because she had heard a rumor married women were not taken to labor camps, she hastily married István Sárkány in 1944. Sárkány was a Hungarian gymnast of the 1930s who achieved national titles and took part in the 1936 Berlin Olympics. They divorced in 1950. Keleti survived the war by purchasing and using an identity paper of a Christian girl and working as a maid in a small village. Her mother and sister went into hiding and were saved by Swedish diplomat Raoul Wallenberg. Her father and other relatives were murdered by the Nazis by gassing in the Auschwitz concentration camp. She managed to survive the Holocaust by hiding in the Hungarian countryside. In the winter of 1944–45, during the Siege of Budapest by Soviet forces near the end of World War II, Keleti would in the morning collect bodies of those who had died and place them in a mass grave.

After the war, Keleti played the cello professionally and resumed training. In 1946, she won her first Hungarian championship. In 1947, she won the Central European gymnastics title. She qualified for the 1948 Summer Olympics, but missed the competition due to tearing a ligament in her ankle. She is listed on the Official List of Gymnastic Participants as Ágnes Sárkány.  At the World University Games of 1949 she won four gold, one silver, and one bronze medal.

She continued training and competed at the Olympics for the first time at the age of 31 at the 1952 Games in Helsinki. She earned four medals: gold in the floor exercise, silver in the team competition, and bronze in the team portable apparatus event and the uneven bars. Keleti continued on to the 1954 World Championships, where she won on the uneven bars, becoming world champion. At the 1956 Summer Olympics in Melbourne, Keleti won six medals including gold medals in three of the four individual event finals: floor, bars, and balance beam, and placed second in the all-around. She was the most successful athlete at these games. The Hungarian team placed first in the portable apparatus event and second in the team competition. At the age of 35, Keleti became the oldest female gymnast ever to win gold. The Soviet Union invaded Hungary during the 1956 Olympics. Keleti, along with 44 other athletes from the Hungarian delegation, decided to remain in Australia and received political asylum. She became a coach for Australian gymnasts.

Keleti emigrated to Israel in 1957, competing in the 1957 Maccabiah Games, and was able to send for her mother and sister. In 1959, she married Hungarian physical education teacher Robert Biro whom she met in Israel, and they had two sons, Daniel and Rafael.  Following her retirement from competition, Keleti worked as a physical education instructor at Tel Aviv University, and for 34 years at the Wingate Institute for Sports in Netanya.
 She also coached and worked with Israel's national gymnastics team well into the 1990s. Since 2015, she has lived in Budapest.
Keleti has been the oldest Hungarian Olympic champion since Sándor Tarics died on 21 May 2016. She became the oldest living Olympic champion when Lydia Wideman died on 13 April 2019. She celebrated her 100th birthday in January 2021.

Awards and honors
 Keleti was inducted into the International Jewish Sports Hall of Fame in 1981, the Hungarian Sports Hall of Fame in 1991, the International Women's Sports Hall of Fame in 2001, and the International Gymnastics Hall of Fame in 2002.
Keleti was named  Hungary's 12 "Athlete's of the Nation" in 2004
 Asteroid 265594 Keletiágnes, discovered by Krisztián Sárneczky in 2005, was named in her honor. The official  was published by the Minor Planet Center on 12 July 2014.
 In 2017, she was announced laureate of the Israel Prize in the field of sports.

See also
 List of Eastern Bloc defectors
 List of Jews in sports
 List of multiple Olympic gold medalists
 List of multiple Olympic gold medalists at a single Games
 List of Olympic female gymnasts for Hungary
 List of top Olympic gymnastics medalists
 List of multiple Summer Olympic medalists

References

External links
 
 
 
 
 List of competitive results at gymn-forum.net
 

|-

|-

1921 births
Living people
Hungarian female artistic gymnasts
Gymnasts from Budapest
Jewish gymnasts
Olympic gymnasts of Hungary
Olympic gold medalists for Hungary
Olympic silver medalists for Hungary
Olympic bronze medalists for Hungary
Olympic medalists in gymnastics
Gymnasts at the 1952 Summer Olympics
Gymnasts at the 1956 Summer Olympics
World champion gymnasts
Medalists at the World Artistic Gymnastics Championships
Competitors at the 1957 Maccabiah Games
Maccabiah Games competitors for Hungary
Raoul Wallenberg
Hungarian refugees
Jewish refugees
Hungarian defectors
Hungarian emigrants to Israel
Hungarian Jews
Israeli Jews
Academic staff of Wingate Institute
People from Herzliya
Medalists at the 1956 Summer Olympics
Medalists at the 1952 Summer Olympics
Israel Prize in sport recipients
Hungarian centenarians
Israeli centenarians
Women centenarians
International Jewish Sports Hall of Fame inductees
Jewish sportswomen